Martin Štrba (born March 22, 1976) is a Czech coach and former professional ice hockey right winger working as the head coach of the HC Slavia Praha.

Career 
Štrba played in the Czech Extraliga for HC České Budějovice, HC Bílí Tygři Liberec, HC Sparta Praha and BK Mladá Boleslav. He also played in the Russian Superleague for HC Spartak Moscow and the Tipsport Liga for HKM Zvolen.

After retiring in 2013, Štrba became assistant coach for Motor České Budějovice in 2016 and later head coach for Piráti Chomutov in 2019. On April 8, 2020, Štrba was named head coach of Slavia Praha.

References

External links

1976 births
Living people
HC Bílí Tygři Liberec players
Czech ice hockey coaches
Czech ice hockey right wingers
KLH Vajgar Jindřichův Hradec players
BK Mladá Boleslav players
Motor České Budějovice players
IHC Písek players
HC Spartak Moscow players
HC Sparta Praha players
Sportspeople from České Budějovice
HC Tábor players
HKM Zvolen players
Czech expatriate ice hockey players in Russia
Czech expatriate ice hockey players in Slovakia